The Paveh (Persian:پاوه) is an Iranian long-range surface-to-surface cruise missile and has a range of .

Development 
Paveh is a part of the Soumar cruise missile family, which was unveiled in 2015 with the first missile of the family being the Soumar which had a range of 700 km.

and On 2 February 2019, Iran unveiled the Hoveyzah Cruise Missile, a surface-to-surface missile with a claimed range of more than 1,350 kilometers 

Paveh It was unveiled and displayed to the public on 2 February 2023

Capabilities 

Paveh uses retractable wings on its body, and the engine of this cruise missile is also outside the body and is located on its upper part.

Paveh has the ability to take different paths to reach the goal. That is, before reaching the target, it circulates to the required extent and attacks the target from another direction.

Another capability of "Pave" cruise missiles is the ability of these missiles to attack in mass and communicate with each other during the attack. In this method, one of the missiles acts as the leader of the attacking missile group and guides the other missiles. If necessary, one or more of the targeted missiles are sent forward by the platoon leader and are actually baited to open the way for other missiles to be accurately hit.

The media of the Islamic Republic have announced that the new missiles have a range sufficient to reach Israel.

References 

Cruise missiles of Iran